Apart from a number of places in Devon, England, for which Buckland forms the first part of the name (see Buckland (disambiguation)), the name on its own refers to two places in Devon:

 Buckland, Braunton, a historic estate in North Devon
It was listed as a manor in the Domesday Book.

It is separated from Milber by Shaldon Road.

References

Villages in Devon
Former manors in Devon
Newton Abbot